The 1902 Nevada State Sagebrushers football team was an American football team that represented Nevada State University (now known as the University of Nevada, Reno) as an independent during the 1902 college football season. In its second season under head coach Allen Steckle, the team compiled a 1–2 record. W. A. "Art" Keddie and B.B. Smith were assistant coaches.

Schedule

References

Nevada State
Nevada Wolf Pack football seasons
Nevada State Sagebrushers football